The 2017 Africa T20 Cup was the third edition of the Africa T20 Cup, a Twenty20 cricket tournament. It was held in South Africa from 25 August to 25 September 2017, as a curtain-raiser to the 2017–18 South African domestic season. Organised by Cricket South Africa, it featured thirteen South African provincial teams, as well as national representative sides of Kenya, Namibia and Zimbabwe.

The sixteen participating teams were split into four pools of four, with the teams from each pool playing all of their matches at one ground across a single weekend. Defending champions Eastern Province were drawn in Pool B.

Namibia won all three games in Group A, progressing to the semi-finals of the tournament for the first time. Gauteng also progressed to the semi-finals for the first time, after winning Group B. They topped the table with a bonus-point win in their final group match, knocking out defending champions Eastern Province in the process. In Group C, Free State progressed, after beating Northern Cape by 62 runs in the final match of the group. KwaZulu-Natal Inland progressed from Group D after beating Border by six wickets in their final group fixture.

In the first semi-final, KwaZulu-Natal Inland beat Gauteng by 8 wickets to progress to the final. They were joined in the final with Free State, who beat Namibia by 10 wickets. Andries Gous scored a century, the second-ever in the Africa T20 Cup.

KwaZulu-Natal Inland won the tournament, beating Free State by 6 wickets in the final.

Pool A

Squads

Points table

Fixtures

Pool B

Squads

Points table

Fixtures

Pool C

Squads

Points table

Fixtures

Pool D

Squads

Points table

Fixtures

Finals

Semi-finals

Final

References

External links
 Series home at ESPN Cricinfo

2017
2017 in Kenyan cricket
2017 in Namibian sport
2017 in South African cricket
2017 in Zimbabwean cricket
International cricket competitions in 2017